Sir Andrew Jonathan Bate, CBE, FBA, FRSL (born 26 June 1958), is a British academic, biographer, critic, broadcaster, poet, playwright, novelist and scholar. He specialises in Shakespeare, Romanticism and Ecocriticism. He is Foundation Professor of Environmental Humanities in a joint appointment of the College of Liberal Arts, the School of Sustainability and the Global Futures Laboratory at Arizona State University, as well as a Senior Research Fellow at Worcester College in the University of Oxford, where he holds the title of Professor of English Literature. Bate was Provost of Worcester College, Oxford from 2011 to 2019. From 2017 to 2019 he was Gresham Professor of Rhetoric in the City of London. He was knighted in 2015 for services to literary scholarship and higher education.

Early life
Bate was born on 26 June 1958, in Kent, United Kingdom and was educated at Sevenoaks School. He went on to study at St Catharine's College, Cambridge, where he was the first T. R. Henn Scholar and a Charles Oldham Shakespeare Scholar. He earned a double first in English and returned to the college to complete his PhD on "Shakespeare and the English Romantic Imagination" and then become a Research Fellow, after a year at Harvard University, where he held a Harkness Fellowship.

Academic and theatrical career
He was a Fellow of Trinity Hall, Cambridge and then, from 1991 to 2003, King Alfred Professor of English Literature at Liverpool University, before becoming Professor of Shakespeare and Renaissance Literature at University of Warwick, where he was subsequently Honorary Fellow of Creativity in Warwick Business School.

In 2011, he was appointed Provost of Worcester College, Oxford. During his tenure, he led a fundraising campaign to re-endow the college on the occasion of its tercentenary and oversaw the construction of the Sultan Nazrin Shah Centre, which was shortlisted for the Stirling Prize. Bate has held visiting professorships at the University of California, Los Angeles, Yale University, the Folger Shakespeare Library, and the Huntington Library. He sits on the European Advisory Board of the Princeton University Press.

He was a Governor and for nine years a board member of the Royal Shakespeare Company. From 2007 to 2011 sat on the Council of the Arts and Humanities Research Council. In 2010 he was commissioned by Faber and Faber to write a literary life of Ted Hughes. This was cancelled when the Estate of Ted Hughes withdrew co-operation. The book was subsequently recommissioned by HarperCollins as an "unauthorised" biography.

In 2010, The Man from Stratford, his one-man play for Simon Callow, a commission of the Ambassador Theatre Group, toured the UK prior to an opening on the Edinburgh Fringe. It also played in Trieste. In June 2011 and March 2012 it was revived at the Trafalgar Studios, Whitehall, under the title Being Shakespeare. In April 2012, Callow took the show to New York City (Brooklyn Academy of Music) and Chicago. In 2014, it was revived in the West End at the Harold Pinter Theatre.

Writer
His publications include Shakespeare and the English Romantic Imagination (1986), Shakespearean Constitutions (1989), Shakespeare and Ovid (1993), the Arden edition of Titus Andronicus (1995, revised and updated with extended introduction, 2018), The Genius of Shakespeare (1997), two influential works of ecocriticism, Romantic Ecology (1991) and The Song of the Earth (2000), and a novel based indirectly on the life of William Hazlitt, The Cure for Love.  His biography of John Clare (2003) won the Hawthornden Prize and the James Tait Black Memorial Prize (for biography), as well as being short listed for the Samuel Johnson Prize, the Royal Society of Literature Heinemann Prize and the South Bank Show Award. In America it won the NAMI Book Award. The Genius of Shakespeare was praised by Sir Peter Hall, founder of the RSC, as "the best modern book on Shakespeare". It was reissued with a new afterword in 2008 and again in 2016 as a Picador Classic, with a further afterword and a new introduction by Simon Callow. Bate also edited Clare's Selected Poetry (Faber and Faber, 2004).

With Eric Rasmussen, Bate edited Shakespeare's Complete Works for the Royal Shakespeare Company, published in April 2007 as part of the Random House Modern Library. This was the first edition since that of Nicholas Rowe in 1709 to use the First Folio as primary copy text for all the plays. It won the Falstaff Award for best Shakespearean book of the year. The edition faced criticism for removing A Lover's Complaint from the Shakespeare canon. Each play is also published in an individual volume, with additional materials, including interviews with leading stage directors.

A companion volume of the "apocryphal" plays was published in 2013 under the title Collaborative Plays by Shakespeare and Others. It is the first Shakespeare collection to include The Spanish Tragedy, laying out the argument for Shakespeare's authorship of the additional scenes. It also won the Falstaff Award.

Bate's intellectual and contextual biography Soul of the Age: The Life, Mind and World of William Shakespeare (London, 2008, and in the United States as Soul of the Age: A Biography of the Mind of William Shakespeare, Random House, 2009) was runner-up for the PEN American Center's PEN/Jacqueline Bograd Weld Award for the best biography of the year. In 2010 he published English Literature: A Very Short Introduction (Oxford University Press) and in 2011, as editor, The Public Value of the Humanities (Bloomsbury Academic), a work sponsored by the Arts and Humanities Research Council. His monograph How the Classics Made Shakespeare (2019), developed from the inaugural E. H. Gombrich Lectures at the Warburg Institute, was published by Princeton University Press in 2019 and a new biography of William Wordsworth was published on the occasion of the poet's 250th anniversary in April 2020.

Bate is also a frequent writer and presenter of documentary features for BBC Radio 4. His subjects have included The Elizabethan Discovery of England, Faking the Classics, The Poetry of History (in which poems about great events are compared to historical accounts), and In Wordsworth's Footsteps (broadcast for the 250th anniversary of William Wordsworth). He wrote the script for Simon Callow's one-man show Shakespeare: the Man from Stratford (later renamed Being Shakespeare) for the 2010 Edinburgh Festival.

In 2012 he served as consultant curator for the British Museum round reading room exhibition for the Cultural Olympiad, Shakespeare: Staging the World, co-writing the catalogue with curator Dora Thornton.

His 2015 biography, Ted Hughes: The Unauthorised Life, published globally by HarperCollins, was shortlisted for the Samuel Johnson Prize and was named by the Biographers' International Organization as the outstanding biography of the year in the category of Arts and Literature.

He is widely regarded as having made a significant contribution to the study of Shakespearean sources, texts and reception, to influence study and the endurance of the classics, to ecocriticism, to the revived reputations of Shakespeare's Titus Andronicus and of the poet John Clare, as well as to the sustaining of public discourse about the humanities in general and literature in particular. The British Council provides an overview of his career at https://literature.britishcouncil.org/writer/jonathan-bate, as does the New Statesman at https://www.newstatesman.com/culture/2022/06/jonathan-bate-to-me-shakespeare-is-the-great-enabler. He has surveyed the trajectory of his critical career in an interview with the online scholarly journal Expositions:  https://expositions.journals.villanova.edu/article/view/2211/1990.

Personal life
He is married to the author and biographer Paula Byrne. They have three children.

Honours
In the 2006 Queen's Birthday Honours, he was appointed Commander of the Order of the British Empire (CBE) "for services to higher education". He was knighted in the 2015 New Year Honours for services to literary scholarship and higher education.

He was elected Fellow of the British Academy (FBA) in 1999 and Fellow of the Royal Society of Literature (FRSL) in 2004. He is an Honorary Fellow of his undergraduate college, St Catharine's College, Cambridge.

Bibliography

Books

Co-editor, 

Editor, 

Co-editor, 

The Shepherd's Hut: Poems. Unbound. 2017. 978-1-7835-2430-3

Bright Star, Green Light: The Beautiful Works & Damned Lives of John Keats & F. Scott Fitzgerald. William Collins UK; Yale University Press USA. 2021. ISBN 978-0-3002-5657-4

Editions

 (Revised version, 2018)

Articles

Out of the Twilight, New Statesman, 130, no. 4546, (16 July 2001), pp. 25–27.

‘Othello and the Other: Turning Turk: The Subtleties of Shakespeare's Treatment of Islam’,
TLS: The Times Literary Supplement, 19 October 2001, pp. 14-15.

Hazlitt, William (1778-1830), Oxford Dictionary of National Biography (Oxford University Press, 2004),

‘Was Shakespeare an Essex Man?’, Proceedings of the British Academy, 162 (2009), pp. 1-28. The 2008 British Academy Shakespeare Lecture.

‘Shakespeare in the Twilight of Romanticism: Wagner, Swinburne, Pater’, Shakespeare Jahrbuch, 146 (2010), pp.11-25. The 2009 Shakespeares-Tag Lecture, Weimar.

‘Much throwing about of brains’, Brain: A Journal of Neurology, 132.9 (September 2009), pp. 2617–2620, https://doi.org/10.1093/brain/awp205

‘Books do Furnish a Mind: the Art and Science of Bibliotherapy’, with Andrew Schuman, The Lancet, 20 Feb 2016, https://doi.org/10.1016/S0140-6736(16)00337-8

‘“The infirmity of his age”: Shakespeare’s 400th Anniversary’, The Lancet, 23 April 2016, https://doi.org/10.1016/S0140-6736(16)30269-0

‘The Anatomy of Melancholy Revisited’, The Lancet, 6 May 2017, https://doi.org/10.1016/S0140-6736(17)31152-2

‘The worst is not, so long as we can say “This is the worst”’, The Lancet, 14 April 2020,
https://doi.org./10.1016/S0140-6736(20)30811-4

‘Cherchez la femme: Keats and Mrs Jones’, TLS: The Times Literary Supplement, 19 February 2021, 
https://www.the-tls.co.uk/issues/february-19-2021/

‘John Keats in the season of mists’, The Lancet, 22 February 2021,
https://doi.org/10.1016/S0140-6736(21)00449-9

References

External links
 
 Jonathan Bate's blog
 Jonathan Bate's page at contemporarywriters.com
 Jonathan Bate's page at the University of Warwick

1958 births
Academics of the University of Warwick
Alumni of St Catharine's College, Cambridge
Commanders of the Order of the British Empire
English biographers
Fellows of St Catharine's College, Cambridge
Fellows of the Royal Society of Literature
Harvard University alumni
James Tait Black Memorial Prize recipients
Living people
People educated at Sevenoaks School
Shakespearean scholars
Provosts of Worcester College, Oxford
21st-century British writers
20th-century English novelists
Knights Bachelor
20th-century biographers
21st-century biographers
Fellows of the British Academy